Events in the year 1644 in Norway.

Incumbents
Monarch: Christian IV

Events

Røros Copper Works is established.
22 December – Norwegian troops fought in the Battle of Bysjön.

Arts and literature

Births

Deaths

See also

References